Local adaptation is a mechanism in evolutionary biology whereby a population of organisms evolves to be more well-suited to its local environment than other members of the same species that live elsewhere. Local adaptation requires that different populations of the same species experience different natural selection. For example, if a species lives across a wide range of temperatures, populations from warm areas may have better heat tolerance than populations of the same species that live in the cold part of its geographic range.

Definition

More formally, a population is said to be locally adapted if organisms in that population have evolved different phenotypes than other populations of the same species, and local phenotypes have higher fitness in their home environment compared to individuals that originate from other locations in the species range. This is sometimes called 'home site advantage'. A stricter definition of local adaptation requires 'reciprocal home site advantage', where for a pair of populations each out performs the other in its home site. This definition requires that local adaptation result in a fitness trade-off, such that adapting to one environment comes at the cost of poorer performance in a different environment.  Before 2004, reciprocal transplants sometimes considered populations locally adapted if the population experienced its highest fitness in its home site vs the foreign site (i.e. compared the same population at multiple sites, vs. multiple populations at the same site). This definition of local adaptation has been largely abandoned after Kawecki and Ebert argued convincingly that populations could be adapted to poor-quality sites but still experience higher fitness if moved to a more benign site (right panel of figure).

Testing for local adaptation 
Testing for local adaptation requires measuring the fitness of organisms from one population in both their local environment and in foreign environments. This is often done using transplant experiments. Using the stricter definition of reciprocal home site advantage, local adaptation is often tested via reciprocal transplant experiments. In reciprocal transplants, organisms from one population are transplanted into another population, and vice versa, and their fitness is measured (see figure). If local transplants outperform (i.e. have higher fitness than) the foreign transplants at both sites, the local populations are said to be locally adapted. If local adaptation is defined simply as a home site advantage of one population (local sources outperform foreign sources at a common site), it can be tested for using common garden experiments, where multiple source populations are grown in a common site, as long as one of the source populations is local to that site.  

Transplant experiments have most often been done with plants or other organisms that do not move. However, evidence for rapid local adaptation in mobile animals has been gathered through transplant experiments with Trinidadian guppies.

Frequency of local adaptation 
Several meta-analyses have attempted to quantify how common local adaptation is, and generally reach similar conclusions.  Roughly 75% of transplant experiments (mostly with plants) find that local populations outcompete foreign populations at a common site, but less than 50% find the reciprocal home site advantage that defines classic local adaptation. Exotic plants are locally adapted to their invasive range as often and as strongly as native plant are locally adapted, suggesting that local adaptation can evolve relatively rapidly. However, biologists likely test for local adaptation where they expect to find it.  Thus these numbers likely reflect local adaptation between obviously differing sites, rather than the probability than any two randomly-selected populations within a species are locally adapted.

Drivers of local adaptation 
Any component of the environment can drive local adaptation, as long as it affects fitness differently at different sites (creating divergent selection among sites), and does so consistently enough for populations to evolve in response. Seminal examples of local adaptation come from plants that adapted to different elevations or to tolerate heavy metals in soils. Interactions among species (e.g. herbivore-plant interactions) can also drive local adaptation, though do not seem to be as important as abiotic factors, at least for plants in temperate ecosystems. Many examples of local adaptation exist in host-parasite systems as well. For instance, a host may be resistant to a locally-abundant pathogen or parasite, but conspecific hosts from elsewhere where that pathogen is not abundant may have no evolved no such adaptation.

See also

References

Evolutionary biology